Shruti Sharma is an Indian actress who primarily works in Hindi television. She started her career as a contestant on the reality show India's Next Superstars in 2018 and then made her acting debut on television in 2019 with Gathbandhan where she played IPS Dhanak Parekh.

Sharma made her film debut with the Telugu film Agent Sai Srinivasa Athreya (2019) and made her Hindi film debut with Pagglait (2021). She also played the dual role of Kahani Verma and Satya Singh Verma in Namak Issk Ka.

Career
Sharma entered Hindi television as a participant in India's Next Superstars in 2018 and emerged as the "Third Superstar". The same year she made her web debut with the YouTube web series Blockbuster Zindagi alongside Aakarshit Gupta. She appeared in a music video, Main Hua Tera alongside Avitesh Shrivastava in 2018.

She made her acting debut in January 2019 with the television show, Gathbandhan where she played the role of IPS Dhanak Parekh, a police officer who marries a don opposite Abrar Qazi. The show went off-air in November 2019. Sharma made her film debut with the 2019 Telugu film Agent Sai Srinivasa Athreya opposite Naveen Polishetty in the role of assistant detective. It received positive reviews from the critics, and was successful at the box office.

In 2020, Sharma played the lead role of Daivik Palak Verma Chaudhary in supernatural series Nazar 2 opposite Sheezan Mohammed. It ended early due to the situation of Covid-19. She then played Shayari Choudhary alongside Shehzada Dhami in Yehh Jadu Hai Jinn Ka! the same year. In November 2020, she starred in Namak Issk Ka portraying the double role of Kahani Verma/Chamcham and Satya Verma opposite Aditya Ojha. The show went off-air in August 2021.

Sharma made her Hindi film debut with Sanya Malhotra's Pagglait in 2021. She played the role of Nazia Zaidi. It received mixed to positive reviews.

Filmography

Films

Television

Web series

Music videos

See also
List of Hindi television actresses
List of Indian television actresses
List of Hindi film actresses

References

External links
 
 

Living people
Actresses in Telugu cinema
Indian television actresses
Indian soap opera actresses
Indian film actresses
21st-century Indian actresses
Actresses in Hindi television
Year of birth missing (living people)